César Manuel Medina Lozada (born 8 May 1991) is a Peruvian footballer who plays as an attacking midfielder for Tarma.

Club career
He started his career playing for local side Club Cultural Casma in 2008.
Then in January 2009 Medina joined Torneo Descentralizado club José Gálvez FBC. He made his debut in the Descentralizado in the 2009 season. In his first season in the top-flight he only managed to make 5 appearances.

Honours
José Gálvez FBC
Torneo Intermedio (1): 2011
Segunda División Peruana (1): 2011

References

External links

1991 births
Living people
People from Chimbote
Association football midfielders
Peruvian footballers
José Gálvez FBC footballers
León de Huánuco footballers
Unión Comercio footballers
Sport Loreto players
Carlos A. Mannucci players
Peruvian Primera División players
Peruvian Segunda División players